"Holly Holy" is a song written and recorded by Neil Diamond with instrumental backing provided by the American Sound Studio house band in Memphis. Released as a single on October 13, 1969, it was a successful follow-on to "Sweet Caroline", reaching #6 on the U.S. pop singles chart by December. The song also reached #5 on the Easy Listening chart. It became a gold record and then eventually a platinum record.

A work with a spiritual focus, "Holly Holy" was influenced by gospel music and was Diamond's favorite of the songs he had written to that point.

"Holly Holy" was later included on Diamond's November 1969 album Touching You, Touching Me. It has been included in live versions on Diamond's Hot August Night (from 1972) and Greatest Hits: 1966–1992 (from 1992) as well as various compilations.

Chart history

Weekly charts

Year-end charts

Other versions
Produced by Clancy Eccles in 1970, the song was an instant success for Jamaican reggae group the Fabulous Flames, almost crossing into the UK's popular music chart.  

The song was covered by Nancy Sinatra and released on her album Shifting Gears in 2013.

In popular culture
The song was used in Mike Flanagan's Netflix miniseries Midnight Mass during a montage in the third episode. Additionally, it was played live in concert at the end of the 2001 film Saving Silverman during the end credits scene by Neil Diamond (as himself) and the main cast members (in character). It was also featured in the Kevin James film Here Comes the Boom as James's character's entrance song.

References

External links
 

1969 singles
1971 singles
Neil Diamond songs
Songs written by Neil Diamond
Junior Walker songs
Uni Records singles
1969 songs
Song recordings produced by Tom Catalano